Siobhan Thompson (born 29 July, 1984) is a British sketch comedian and comedy writer. She is known for her work on the CollegeHumor Originals web series and has appeared in other programs such as Adam Ruins Everything and Broad City. She is also a staff writer for Adult Swim's Rick and Morty.

Biography
Thompson originally came from England to the United States to be an archaeologist, but soon found herself drawn to comedy. She began taking classes at the Upright Citizens Brigade in 2010, and is a member of their Maude team Alamo. She is also the former host of the BBC America web series "Anglophenia", the co-host of the sketch comedy podcast Left Handed Radio, and has appeared in multiple television shows.

She first appeared in a CollegeHumor sketch in May 2015, and left the company at the end of 2016, before returning in late 2017.

In June 2018, it was announced that Joss Whedon would produce a comedy TV series created by Thompson and Rebecca Drysdale to air on Freeform.

Thompson is also a player on Dimension 20, a Dungeons and Dragons actual-play show which premiered September 2018 on Dropout, CollegeHumor's streaming service. Her characters include Adaine Abernant (Fantasy High, Fantasy High:Sophomore Year), Misty Moore/Rowan Berry (Unsleeping City), Princess Ruby Rocks (A Crown of Candy), Iga Lisowski (The Unsleeping City: Chapter II), Riva (A Starstruck Odyssey), and Princess Rosamund Du Prix (Neverafter). In addition, she guested on Not Another D&D Podcast as Apple Scrumper, and the Rotating Heroes Podcast as Astrid Starborn.

References

External links
 

Living people
British emigrants to the United States
CollegeHumor people
British sketch comedians
British comedy writers
1984 births